The 2009 AFL season was the 113th season of the Australian Football League (AFL), the highest level senior Australian rules football competition in Australia, which was known as the Victorian Football League until 1989. The season featured sixteen clubs, ran from 26 March until 26 September, and comprised a 22-game home-and-away season followed by a finals series featuring the top eight clubs.

The premiership was won by the Geelong Football Club for the eighth time, after it defeated  by twelve points in the 2009 AFL Grand Final.

Pre-season

AFL pre-season draft

The pre-season draft was held on 16 December 2008 (but is referred to as the 2009 Pre-season draft in continuation from the early years of the AFL draft when it was held in January or February) and most pre-draft interest was on whether or not former West Coast Eagles captain and Brownlow Medal winner Ben Cousins would be selected by the Richmond Football Club. Richmond, the only club to show interest in recruiting Cousins, had one selection in the pre-season draft (because it had only one space left on its senior list). In the week leading up to the pre-season draft, Richmond requested to have Graham Polak (who had been hit by a tram the previous season, with it not clear at this stage whether or not the resulting injuries would end his career) moved to the rookie list, to free up an additional list space and give them a second selection in the pre-season draft. The request was similar to one made by and granted to the Essendon Football Club a few years earlier with respect to Adam Ramanauskas, but there were key differences which led to Richmond's request being rejected by the AFL and a majority of rival clubs on 15 December. Although Richmond had maintained throughout the previous week that it would draft Cousins only if its request to put Polak on the rookie list was granted, they selected Cousins anyway with their only selection in the pre-season draft.

NAB Cup

Premiership season

Round 1

Round 2

Round 3

Round 4

Round 5

Round 6

Round 7

Round 8

Round 9

Round 10

Round 11

Round 12

Round 13

Round 14

Round 15

Round 16

Round 17

Round 18

Round 19

Round 20

Round 21

Round 22

Season notes
 missed the finals, become the first reigning premier to do so since  in 1999.
In the final round,  defeated  by 24 points; the win gave the Bulldogs a 0.31% percentage advantage over Collingwood, placing the Bulldogs third and the Magpies fourth. Had Brad Johnson not scored a goal in the final minute, Collingwood would have finished third.

Win/loss table

Bold – Home game

Ladder

Ladder progression

Finals series

Week one

Week two

Week three

Week four

Awards
The Brownlow Medal was awarded to Gary Ablett, Jr. of Geelong, who polled 30 votes during the home and away season.
The AFL Rising Star was awarded to Daniel Rich of the Brisbane Lions, who received the maximum 45 votes.
The Coleman Medal was awarded to Brendan Fevola of Carlton, who kicked 86 goals during the home and away season.
The Wooden Spoon was "awarded" to Melbourne for the second year in a row. Melbourne finished the season in last place on the ladder after 22 rounds, with just 4 wins.
The McClelland Trophy was awarded to St Kilda for finishing 1st on the ladder during the premiership season.
The AFL Players Association Awards were as follows:
The Leigh Matthews Trophy was awarded to Gary Ablett, Jr. from Geelong for being the Most Valuable Player for the third year in a row.
The Robert Rose Award went to Joel Selwood from Geelong for being the Most Courageous Player throughout the premiership season.
Rich blitzed the competition, receiving 463 votes, and the runner-up receiving just 45.

Best and fairest

AFL Rising Star

Goal of the Year

The Australian Football League celebrates the best goal of the season through the annual Goal of the Year competition. From 2009 onwards, the commercial name for the award is the AFL Stores Goal of the Year.

Nominations
 Round 1 – Shannon Hurn (West Coast)
 Round 2 – Jason Winderlich (Essendon)
 Round 3 – Taylor Walker (Adelaide)
 Round 4 – Ryan Houlihan (Carlton)
 Round 5 – Gary Ablett, Jr. (Geelong)
 Round 6 – Drew Petrie (North Melbourne)
 Round 7 – Cyril Rioli (Hawthorn) – Winner
 Round 8 – Michael Osborne (Hawthorn)
 Round 9 – Stephen Milne (St. Kilda)
 Round 10 – Mark LeCras (West Coast)
 Round 11 – David Rodan (Port Adelaide)
 Round 12 – David Rodan (Port Adelaide)
 Round 13 – Nic Naitanui (West Coast)
 Round 14 – Dale Thomas (Collingwood)
 Round 15 – Brendan Fevola (Carlton)
 Round 16 – David Rodan (Port Adelaide)
 Round 17 – Lance Franklin (Hawthorn)
 Round 18 – Leon Davis (Collingwood)
 Round 19 – Adam Schneider (St Kilda)
 Round 20 – Liam Jurrah (Melbourne)
 Round 21 – Brad Dick (Collingwood)
 Round 22 – Shannon Byrnes (Geelong)

Mark of the Year

The Australian Football League celebrates the best mark of the season through the annual Mark of the Year competition. From 2009 onwards, the commercial name for the award is the Hungry Jack's Mark of the Year.

Nominations
 Round 1 – Simon Wiggins (Carlton)
 Round 2 – Jay Schulz (Richmond)
 Round 3 – Matthew Lloyd (Essendon)
 Round 4 – Tom Logan (Port Adelaide)
 Round 5 – Tom Hawkins (Geelong)
 Round 6 – Joel Selwood (Geelong)
 Round 7 – Patrick Ryder (Essendon)
 Round 8 – Paul Bevan (Sydney)
 Round 9 – Heath Grundy (Sydney)
 Round 10 – David Mundy (Fremantle)
 Round 11 – Kurt Tippett (Adelaide)
 Round 12 – Nic Naitanui (West Coast)
 Round 13 – Josh Hill (Western Bulldogs)
 Round 14 – Darren Glass (West Coast)
 Round 15 – Jayden Post (Richmond)
 Round 16 – Liam Jurrah (Melbourne)
 Round 17 – Brendan Fevola (Carlton)
 Round 18 – Jimmy Bartel (Geelong)
 Round 19 – Quinten Lynch (West Coast)
 Round 20 – Lewis Roberts-Thomson (Sydney)
 Round 21 – Max Rooke (Geelong)
 Round 22 – Brett Burton (Adelaide) – Winner

AFL Army Award

The Australian Football League, with the support of the Australian Army, recognises players who produce an act or acts of bravery or selflessness to promote the cause of his team during a game. Each week three players and what they did are made available on the AFL Army Award website for supporters to vote on. The player with the highest percentage of the vote is the AFL Army Award nominee for that round.

Nominations

''For the full list of round-by-round nominees, see 2009 AFL Army Award.

 Round 1 – James Kelly (Geelong)
 Round 2 – Campbell Brown (Hawthorn)
 Round 3 – Luke Ball (St Kilda)
 Round 4 – Ricky Dyson (Essendon)
 Round 5 – Lenny Hayes (St Kilda)
 Round 6 – Martin Mattner (Sydney)
 Round 7 – Bryce Gibbs (Carlton)
 Round 8 – Barry Hall (Sydney)
 Round 9 – Matt White (Richmond)
 Round 10 – Travis Varcoe (Geelong)
 Round 11 – Scott McMahon (North Melbourne)
 Round 12 – Brad Green (Melbourne)
 Round 13 – Patrick Dangerfield (Adelaide)
 Round 14 – Ryan Griffen (Western Bulldogs)
 Round 15 – Nathan Eagleton (Western Bulldogs)
 Round 16 – Jacob Surjan (PA Adelaide)
 Round 17 – Cameron Mooney (Geelong)
 Round 18 – Aaron Davey (Melbourne)
 Round 19 – Brett Kirk (Sydney)
 Round 20 – Stephen Milne (St Kilda)
 Round 21 – Max Rooke (Geelong)
 Round 22 – Tom Hawkins (Geelong) – Winner

Club leadership

Umpiring and rule changes
Two rule changes were introduced into the regular season
If a player is not 'under pressure' and deliberately rushes a behind would be penalised by a free kick at the spot that the ball was rushed;
If a player tackles an opponent after he disposes of the ball, preventing him from taking further part in the play, then a free kick and 50m penalty is paid.

Umpires were also encouraged to recall a centre bounce if it is offline, throwing it up the second time.

Players contacting umpires continued to be an issue with several players fined for making contact with umpires as they retreated from ball-ups. In related offences, Collingwood's Heath Shaw was suspended for one week after touching an umpire's shoulder, and Hawthorn president Jeff Kennett was fined $5000 after criticising the umpires on radio.

Coach changes

See also
2009 Australian football code crowds

References

External links
AFL official website
2009 AFL Fixture
2009 Season – AFL Tables

Australian Football League seasons
AFL season